John Paul Getty may refer to:

 J. Paul Getty (1892–1976), American businessman
 Sir John Paul Getty Jr. (1932–2003), American-born philanthropist and book collector
 John Paul Getty III (1956–2011), elder son of John Paul Getty, Jr

See also
Getty family
John Getty (disambiguation)